Diphtheroptila ochridorsellum is a moth of the family Gracillariidae. It is known from New South Wales, Australia.

The larvae feed on Glochidion ferdinandi. They probably mine the leaves of their host plant.

References

Gracillariinae
Moths described in 1880